This article is a list of historic places in Bas-Saint-Laurent, entered on the Canadian Register of Historic Places, whether they are federal, provincial, or municipal. All addresses are the administrative Region 01. For all other listings in the province of Quebec, see List of historic places in Quebec.

References

Bas
Bas-Saint-Laurent